Korean Air Flight 8702, operated by a Boeing 747-400, departed Tokyo, Narita International Airport on 5 August 1998 at 16:50 for a flight to Seoul, scheduled to arrive there at 19:20. Bad weather, including heavy rainfall, at Seoul forced the flight crew to divert to Jeju. The aircraft took off from Jeju at 21:07 for Seoul. The flight was cleared to land on runway 14R with a crosswind component as the wind was from 220 degrees at 22 knots. Upon touchdown, the aircraft rolled off the runway. The aircraft slid into a ditch. The undercarriage was destroyed by the impact and the fuselage split. After the crash, the inside of the aircraft caught fire, but all the occupants were able to evacuate the aircraft.

At the time of the accident, there were 27 other Boeing 747-400 aircraft in the Korean Air fleet.

Aircraft
The aircraft involved was a Boeing 747-4B5, registration HL7496 delivered to Korean Air on 27 June 1996. Two years and two months old, it was the 21st 747-400 delivered to Korean Air and one of 27 in the fleet at the time of the accident. With line number 1083 and Construction Number (MSN) 26400, it had not been involved in any serious incidents in the time leading up to the crash.

The aircraft involved was the fourth of five Boeing 747s (2 -200, 1 -300, this -400 and 1 -200F) to be written off by Korean Air in a span of 15 years.

Crash
Korean Air flight 8702 was a scheduled flight from Tokyo, Narita International Airport to Seoul, Gimpo International Airport. Due to poor weather, the crew diverted to Jeju International Airport. Upon landing the aircraft was towed to the main terminal and the passengers temporarily disembarked into the terminal. Two hours later the passengers re-boarded the aircraft for the 1 hour flight back to Seoul.

The aircraft took off from Jeju at 21:07 for Seoul. The flight was cleared to land on runway 14R with a crosswind component as the wind was from 220 degrees at 22 knots. Upon touchdown, the captain misused the reverse thrusters in a way the No. 1 engine failed to provide reverse thrust. Coupled with the fact the captain was confused with crosswind conditions and the first officer was preoccupied and not paying attention to the landing, the 747 failed to stop before the end of the runway. The aircraft swerved to the right and slid into a ditch at 50 knots with the fuselage splitting up.

References

8702
Accidents and incidents involving the Boeing 747
Aviation accidents and incidents in 1998
Aviation accidents and incidents in South Korea
Airliner accidents and incidents caused by weather
Airliner accidents and incidents caused by pilot error
1998 in South Korea
Gimpo International Airport
August 1998 events in Asia